Viossa is an experimental, community-created, constructed pidgin created from 2014 onwards by members of the r/conlangs online community. The language was created to test language contact, and can be classified as an engineered language.

The language's name is derived from a contraction of the Viossa words "vi" (we) and "glossa" (language).

History 
The Viossa Project was started on 24 December 2014, by members of the Skype group complementary to the r/conlangs subreddit. The language was developed via videotelephony, which allowed its creators (who were geographically isolated) to simulate the conditions of naturalistic pidgin formation. In video calls, each participant selected a language which was mutually unintelligible from as many of the others as possible, and the use of English was generally prohibited.

Viossa was originally constituted by seven or so source languages, chosen by its first six speakers (namely Russian, Albanian, Japanese, Greek, Finnish, Norwegian, and Swiss German). Further languages such as Northern Sámi, Old English, Swedish, Ainu, Irish and Latin would also later influence the pidgin, as new speakers would introduce a source language by contributing lexical and grammatical material.

Viossa was the second attempt to create a constructed pidgin by the r/conlangs group. The first, entitled "NEA (No English Allowed)", failed as speakers resorted to simply speaking in each of their languages rather than mixing them.

Linguistic features 
Viossa is characterized by its lack of standardization, especially in grammar and orthography. Each user of the language develops a personal idiolect, with sentence structure, vocabulary, and spelling corresponding to both taste and social context. The language operates under the principle that "if it can be understood by everyone, it is Viossa". As a result, only generalizations can be made about the use of the language, which may not reflect the usage of all individuals. As personal varieties are heavily influenced by a speaker's native language, Viossa is sometimes referred to as an interlanguage.

The majority of Viossa users use a SVO word order, although SOV and OSV word orders are used by minorities, according to a 2021 study by Nichols. Grammatical case is typically not marked, but verb agreement has been seen to take place, inflecting for grammatical person and number (although compound subject are exempt from this). Pronouns differentiate between person and number, but generally show no distinction in grammatical gender. 

Orthography in Viossa varied to a great extent between speakers and is viewed by many as a means of self-expression. The most frequently used script is Latin, often with the use of diacritics and uncommon letters, though speakers have also devised variant writing systems from Cyrillic, Hebrew, Kana, and Chinese characters.

Community 
The Viossa community operates almost exclusively as an online community, based primarily on Discord, where it is learned and taught by immersion. Translation between Viossa and other languages is largely forbidden, except in circumstances such as academic studies of the language and artistic translations of media.

A wiki in Viossa named "Vikoli" using MediaWiki software exists. Original music has been created in the language, most notably the album Korohtella released in February 2022 by DJIMA. Several podcasts in Viossa also exist, notably Davi Hanu! and K'Slucj, which are both released sporadically.

Flag 

The flag of Viossa is often used to represent the language, and consists of a blue bird surrounded by a white circle on a blue field. The bird used in the flag depicts a pigeon (a pun on the word "pidgin"), positioned similarly to the letter V, the first letter of the language's name. The flag was first proposed in 2016 by u/clausangeloh, and uses a colour scheme consisting of #00bbff  and #fff  .

External links 

 Ka du Hanasu? - speech by Sascha M. Baer on the creation of Viossa
 Conlang Critic - Viossa - video about Viossa (especially phonology), with interviews with Viossa speakers
 https://vikoli.org - wiki in Viossa
 Original Reddit Post announcing Viossa by u/salpfish

References 

Constructed languages
Pidgins and creoles
Languages without ISO 639-3 code
Engineered languages